Andrew Joseph Wolverton (born June 4, 1993) is an American soccer player.

Early life

College and amateur
In high school, Wolverton started in goal for all four years and also played club soccer with the Concorde Fire USSD Academy under Gregg Blasingame.

Wolverton was in goal for the Penn State Nittany Lions men's soccer between 2011 and 2014. As a freshman, Wolverton started all 22 games for the Nittany Lions and earned 11 shutouts in his first campaign, breaking a PSU record. In all, he made a total of 72 appearances for the Nittany Lions and finished with a 0.53 Goals Against Average and recorded 32 clean sheets.

During his time with the Nittany Lions, Wolverton won numerous honors, including - 2011 College Soccer News All-Freshman Third Team, 2012 and 2014 All-Big Ten Second Team, 2013 Big Ten Goalkeeper of the Year, 2013 NSCAA All-Great Lakes First Team, 2013 All-Big Ten First Team, 2014 All-Big Ten First Team, and 2014 Big Ten Preseason Player To Watch.

During his time in college, Wolverton also played for Bradenton Academics in the USL Premier Development League.

Club career

LA Galaxy
Wolverton was drafted in the fourth round (82nd overall) of the 2015 MLS SuperDraft by LA Galaxy. Wolverton was only the sixth Big Ten player taken in this year's draft, joining the likes of  Fatai Alashe and Adam Montague of Michigan State, Dan Metzger and Alex Shinsky of Maryland and Tyler Miller of Northwestern.

Wolverton also became the seventh Nittany Lion soccer player to be drafted into a Major League Soccer club, following John Gallagher (Chicago Fire 2013), Mark Fetrow (Vancouver Whitecaps 2012), Corey Hertzog (NY Red Bulls 2011), Drew Cost (Real Salt Lake 2011) and Jason Yeisley (FC Dallas 2010).

Although, Wolverton was drafted in January, he had to wait five months before he was able to join the team for training due to a foot surgery that same month as the draft. On 6 June 2015, Wolverton was called to the bench as Brian Rowe's backup for the first time against Vancouver Whitecaps. Wolverton again was the backup keeper on 17 June, covering for Brian Perk in the 6–1 over PSA Elite in the Open Cup.

On 11 July 2015, Wolverton made his professional debut in the opener of 2015 International Champions Cup against Club América when he replaced Brian Rowe in the 62nd minute. On August 15, Wolverton made his professional debut for USL affiliate club LA Galaxy II in a 3–2 victory over Austin Aztex.

International career
Wolverton has represented the United States in the under-18 level.

Career statistics

Personal life
Born in Atlanta, Georgia, Wolverton went to St. Pius X Catholic High School before attending to Pennsylvania State University. During his time at Penn State, Wolverton majored in management.

Wolverton is the youngest of three, with two older sisters, and is the son of Jay and Ann Wolverton.

References

External links
 
 Penn State University bio
 

1993 births
Living people
American soccer players
Penn State Nittany Lions men's soccer players
IMG Academy Bradenton players
LA Galaxy players
LA Galaxy II players
Association football goalkeepers
Soccer players from Georgia (U.S. state)
LA Galaxy draft picks
USL League Two players
USL Championship players
United States men's youth international soccer players